The 2005 Formula Renault 3.5 Series was the first Formula Renault 3.5 Series season. The season began on 1 May at Zolder, Belgium and finished at Monza, Italy on 23 October after 17 races. Robert Kubica was crowned series champion.

Teams and drivers

Calendar

Results

Points System
Points were awarded at the end of each race according to the following system:

In addition:
 One point was awarded for Pole position for each race
 One point was awarded for Fastest lap for each race
The maximum number of points a driver could earn each weekend (except Monaco) was 34 and the maximum number for a team was 58.

Results

Driver standings

† = Driver did not finish but was classified, having completed more than 90% of race distance.

Team standings

† = Driver did not finish but was classified, having completed more than 90% of race distance.

References

formula3.cc Results.
speedsportmag.com Results and entry list.

Formula Renault 3.5 Series
World Series Formula V8 3.5 seasons
2005 in European sport
Renault 3.5